The Canton of Isle-Loue-Auvézère is a canton of the Dordogne département, in France. It was created at the French canton reorganisation, which came into effect in March 2015, from the former canton of Lanouaille and parts of the former cantons of Excideuil, Savignac-les-Églises, Thenon and Hautefort. Its seat is the town Excideuil.

Communes

The communes of the canton of Isle-Loue-Auvézère are:

Angoisse
Anlhiac
Brouchaud
Cherveix-Cubas
Clermont-d'Excideuil
Coulaures
Cubjac-Auvézère-Val d'Ans
Dussac
Excideuil
Génis
Lanouaille
Mayac
Payzac
Preyssac-d'Excideuil
Saint-Cyr-les-Champagnes
Saint-Germain-des-Prés
Saint-Jory-las-Bloux
Saint-Martial-d'Albarède
Saint-Médard-d'Excideuil
Saint-Mesmin
Saint-Pantaly-d'Excideuil
Saint-Raphaël
Saint-Sulpice-d'Excideuil
Saint-Vincent-sur-l'Isle
Salagnac
Sarlande
Sarrazac
Savignac-Lédrier
Savignac-les-Églises

References

See also 
 Cantons of the Dordogne department

Cantons of Dordogne